Fada N'gourma, also written Fada-Ngourma or Noungu, is a city and an important market town in eastern Burkina Faso, lying  east of Ouagadougou, in the Gourmantché area. It is the capital of the East region and of Gourma province.  It is known for its blanket and carpet manufacturing as well as its honey.

Etymology
In Hausa, Fada N'gourma means "place where one pays the tax".

History
The town was founded by Diaba Lompo as Bingo at the beginning of the 13th century. The French arrived at the town in January 1895 and the local Gurma ruler accepted French protection.

Climate 
Fada N'gourma has a hot semi-arid climate (Köppen climate classification BSh).

Health 
The city features both state and private health facilities. The city is the site of a Regional Hospital Center, the reference hospital for the East region.

International relations

Organizations 
The following international organizations have offices in Fada N'gourma:

 Action Against Hunger
 Helvetas Swiss Intercooperation
 Initiative: Eau
 Îles de Paix

Gallery

Notes

References

Populated places in the Est Region (Burkina Faso)